The Goyeneche Palace in Nuevo Baztán, Community of Madrid, Spain, is an eighteenth-century palace with a linked church.  It was designed by José de Churriguera, an architect known for a profusely decorated style known as Churrigueresque. The church's interior is an example of this baroque style, whereas the exterior is less ornate.

The building is one of a number of palaces in Spain and Peru which are associated with the Goyeneche family.  Nuevo Baztán was built as a model village by Juan de Goyeneche (1656–1735) to accommodate industrial and agricultural projects. 

The dedication of the church to Saint Francis Xavier reflects the Navarrese origins of the Goyeneche family.

Conservation and access
Since the 1940s the palace and church have been protected for their historical interest.  They currently have the heritage listing of Bien de Interés Cultural along with two squares which form their setting.
In 2007 it was reported that the palace was in a poor state of conservation.

Current use
There have been proposals to restore the palace for use as an art gallery, although the project appears to have been put on hold. The idea was a collaboration between the Community of Madrid and the art-collector Carmen Thyssen-Bornemisza who indicated her willingness to display items from her private collection on long-term loan. 

The palace has extensive cellars built for storage purposes and these are used to house an interpretation centre. There are also guided tours of the palace itself.

External links

Asociación del Patrimonio Artístico de Nuevo Baztán

References

Palaces in the Community of Madrid
Churches in the Community of Madrid
Baroque architecture in the Community of Madrid
Bien de Interés Cultural landmarks in the Community of Madrid